Yoav Omer (born 28 October 1998) is an Israeli windsurfer. He won a silver medal at the 2018 RS:X European Championships in Sopot. Omer is the 2015 and 2016 junior world champion. He also competed for Israel at the 2014 Summer Youth Olympics.

References

External links
 

1998 births
Living people
Israeli windsurfers
Sailors at the 2014 Summer Youth Olympics